Karuba may refer to:

 Karuba (board game), a tile-laying race game
 Karuba, Democratic Republic of the Congo, a village
 Karuba, Estonia, a village
 Karuba, a brand of coffee sold at Kwik Trip